“My passion for art and my belief that art empowers and lifts the human spirit has only grown stronger throughout my life.  I have been blessed with many generous and selfless mentors, and my dream is to pass those gifts on to others”.  To this end Gary Lee Price often teaches workshops to individuals, groups and corporations on the aspects of creation and manifestation.

Gary Lee Price (born May 2, 1955) is an American sculptor.

Biography 

At the age of 6 years old Gary Lee Price witnessed the murder-suicide of his Mom, Betty Jo Reeder, and his step-dad, Ted Reeder in Manheim, Germany. He was shipped back to the states to be raised by his mom's first husband, Wayne Price. Price went to both grade school and high school in Montpelier, Idaho.  After graduating from Montpelier High School, he went on to study at Ricks College in Rexburg, Idaho. He then served a two-year mission for the Church of Jesus Christ of Latter-day Saints in southern Germany. Following his mission, Price studied in Jerusalem for six months through Brigham Young University’s Study Abroad program. He then studied at the Utah Technical College in Orem, Utah (now Utah Valley University), where he met and studied with sculptor Stan Johnson. With Stan Johnsons encouragement, Gary Lee Price decided to continue his education at the University of Utah where he graduated with a BA in Art. His professional sculpting career took off almost immediately with the sales of his early Western and Native American pieces, including "Sacred Meat" and "Ascent". Price credits the piece "Ascent" as the inspiration for his "Statue of Responsibility". Stephen R. Covey was instrumental in introducing Gary Lee Price to the Statue of Responsibility. Dr Covey was a friend and colleague of holocaust survivor, Viktor E. Frankl, author of Man's Search for Meaning, Covey made a commitment to Frankl to make sure that Dr. Frankl's vision of a Statue of Responsibility on the West coast would one day "bookend" the Statue of Liberty on the East coast. Price holds the trademarks and copyrights for this history making project. Price is currently the official sculptor of the Statue of Responsibility. Price and his wife, Leesa Clark-Price have created a non-profit organization, Statue of Responsibility Foundation which is currently in Phase III of this history making endeavor. Gary Lee Price has sculptures placed in locations all around the world.  Price's memoirs, Divine Turbulence will be released in the Spring of 2022.

Career 
After leaving Utah Valley University, Price enrolled at the University of Utah to study painting, drawing, and anatomy.  He studied under Alvin Gittins as well as Stan Johnson. In 1982, he earned his B.F.A in painting and drawing.
During his high-school years, Price painted and sold his landscape paintings. Later on, he worked as a ranch hand, a farmer, a jewelry salesperson and manager, and worked in Stan Johnson’s studio and foundry in Mapleton, Utah.  Price gained many skills through his work including mold making, wax and slurry casting, and welding. These skills would later become very important in influencing the direction of his art. Some of his earliest subjects include Southwestern and wildlife themes, such as Buffalo Nickel and Return of Fury. His first recognition came with the Death Valley Art Show, followed by recognition for his sculpture They Rise Highest Who Lift As They Go. aka "Ascent".  

In 1991, Gary Lee Price was elected a member of the National Sculpture Society. In November 2001, he received the "Governor's Mansion Artist Award," from Governor Michael Leavitt of Utah, for his support of the arts. Aside from his sculpture images appearing on the covers of a few various magazines and books, the December 2003 issue of Utah Valley Magazine featured a cover story on Gary and his career entitled, "The Spirit of Giving." In 2005, it was announced that he had been selected to create the 305-foot Statue of Responsibility on the west coast of the United States. Price is currently in Phase III of this history making project. In 2014 Gary was elected by his National Sculpture Society peers to the status of FELLOW.

Works
 GaryLeePrice.Com

References

External links 
arts briefs Daily Herald
Circle of Peace The Art of Loveland.
Gary Price featured at Botanical Gardens Art Business News
Statue removal a tight squeeze in Springville Daily Herald

1955 births
Latter Day Saints from Idaho
American Mormon missionaries in Germany
Brigham Young University alumni
Brigham Young University–Idaho alumni
Living people
University of Utah alumni
Utah Valley University alumni
20th-century American sculptors
American expatriates in Israel
Latter Day Saints from Utah
21st-century American sculptors